
Gmina Sabnie is a rural gmina (administrative district) in Sokołów County, Masovian Voivodeship, in east-central Poland.

Villages
Gmina Sabnie contains the villages and settlements of Chmielnik, Grodzisk, Hilarów, Hołowienki, Jadwisin, Klepki, Kolonia Hołowienki, Kolonia Kurowice, Kostki-Pieńki, Kupientyn, Kupientyn-Kolonia, Kurowice, Nieciecz Włościańska, Nieciecz-Dwór, Niewiadoma, Pieńki Suchodolskie, Sabnie, Stasin, Suchodół Szlachecki, Suchodół Włościański, Tchórznica Szlachecka, Tchórznica Włościańska, Wymysły and Zembrów.

Neighbouring gminas
Gmina Sabnie is bordered by the gminas of Jabłonna Lacka, Kosów Lacki, Repki, Sokołów Podlaski and Sterdyń.

References

Sabnie
Sokołów County